The Home Economics–F.F.A. Building is a historic school building on City Park Drive in Portia, Arkansas.  It is a single-story sandstone structure with a gable roof.  Its entrance is sheltered by a gable-roofed bracketed portico over a concrete stoop, and its roof has typical Craftsman features.  It was built in 1937-38 by a crew from the National Youth Administration with funding from the Works Progress Administration, and served for many years as a school building and social venue.

The building was listed on the National Register of Historic Places in 1990.

See also
National Register of Historic Places listings in Lawrence County, Arkansas

References

School buildings on the National Register of Historic Places in Arkansas
Buildings and structures in Lawrence County, Arkansas
National Register of Historic Places in Lawrence County, Arkansas
National Youth Administration
Works Progress Administration in Arkansas